Asparagus neglectus is a species of Asparagus native to temperate Asia.

References

neglectus